Jump! is a 2007 British-Austrian drama film written and directed by Joshua Sinclair. It starred Ben Silverstone, Patrick Swayze and Martine McCutcheon. It was loosely based on the real-life Halsman murder case. The film was premiered during the 2007 Shanghai International Film Festival.

Synopsis
Set in Austria, in 1928, with the spectre of Nazism on the rise, a young Jew, Philippe Halsman, is accused of patricide after his father's death during a hike through the Alps. His strained relationship with his father, and the apparent evidence that he has been struck on the head with a rock, point towards the son's guilt. Halsman is put on trial, in Innsbruck, where his case is taken up by one of the country's leading lawyers.

Cast
 Ben Silverstone – Phillippe Halsman 
 Patrick Swayze – Richard Pressburger 
 Martine McCutcheon –  Liuba Halsman
 Stefanie Powers – Katherine Wilkins
 Heinz Hoenig – Morduch Halsman 
 Anja Kruse – Ita Halsman 
 Heinz Trixner – Emil Groeschel 
 Christoph Schobesberger – Siegfried Hohenleitner 
 Richard Johnson – Judge Larcher 
 Wolfgang Fierek – Leopold Zipperer 
 Adi Hirschal – Dr. Stein 
 Alf Beinell – Franz Eicher 
 Christian K. Schaeffer – Johan Weiler
 Erik Jan Rippmann – Josef Eder 
 Cornelia Albrecht – Marilyn Monroe 
 Bernd Jeschek – Josef Weil

Production 
Producer Lily Berger has stated that she wanted the movie to serve as a "definitive account of what happened" and that she hoped that it "helps to rehabilitate Philippe Halsman’s name once and for all." The film had a budget of approximately six million Euros. Filming took place partially in Innsbruck, Austria during 2006 and 850 extras were hired for Jump!. Berger has stated that Swayze considered the film "his most important work".

Reception 
LA Weekly panned the film, calling it "Handsomely produced but dramatically inert." Linda Cook reviewed the movie for the Quad City Times, praising the performances of Silverstone and Swayze.

References

External links 
 
 

2007 films
2007 drama films
British drama films
Austrian drama films
English-language Austrian films
Films set in 1928
Films set in Austria
Films about murder
Cultural depictions of Marilyn Monroe
2000s English-language films
2000s British films